Harpal  Pur is a census town in Varanasi tehsil of Varanasi district in the Indian state of Uttar Pradesh. The census town &  village falls under the Harpal Pur gram panchayat. Harpal Pur Census  town & village is about 7.5 kilometers South-West of Varanasi railway station, 315 kilometers South-East of  Lucknow and 10 kilometers North-West of Banaras Hindu University.

Demography

Harpal  Pur has 1,028 families with a total population of 7,710. Sex ratio of the census town & village is 929 and child sex ratio is 1,053. Uttar Pradesh state average for both ratios is 912 and 902  respectively .

Transportation
Harpal  Pur is connected by air (Lal Bahadur Shastri Airport), by train  (Maruadih railway station) and by road. Nearest operational airports is  Lal Bahadur Shastri Airport and nearest operational railway station is  Maruadih railway station (27 and 5.5 kilometers respectively from Harpal  Pur).

See also

 Varanasi Cantt. (Assembly constituency)
 Varanasi district
 Varanasi (Lok Sabha constituency)
 Varanasi tehsil

Notes

  All  demographic data is based on 2011 Census of India.

References 

Census towns in Varanasi district
Cities and towns in Varanasi district